Bzianka  is a district of Rzeszów, Poland, located in the western part of the city.

Bzianka was included within the city limits of Rzeszów on January 1, 2017. Earlier, it was a separate village, located in the administrative district of Gmina Świlcza, within the Rzeszów County, Subcarpathian Voivodeship.

References

Neighbourhoods in Poland
Rzeszów